Ossolano is the dialect spoken in the Ossola valley in North West Italy. It is an umbrella name for a myriad of dialects spoken in the main Ossola valley and the other seven valleys and their subvalley that spread from it. As the territory is very mountainous, many different variations of this language exist. They are mostly intelligible to one another, save for some specific words that seem to have arisen only in some villages and not others. For instance "cat" in mainstream Ossolano is "gat", but in Mozziese is "sciandrun" (the "cinder-one", due to domesticated mountain cats' habit to roll up in front of the fire in mountain huts). Ossolano belongs to the larger family of Insubric languages to which Milanese belongs.

Perhaps the most famous poet in the Ossolan language is Giovanni Leoni (affectionately known as "Ul Torototela", the bard), merchant, sea farer and alpinist who still inspires the locals.

References 

Western Lombard language